Gerald Dixon (born June 20, 1969) is a former American football linebacker. He played college football for South Carolina and spent ten seasons in the National Football League (NFL) from 1992 to 2001.

College career
Dixon initially attended Garden City (Kansas) Community College, where he was named the conference player of the year in 1989, before transferring to South Carolina the following season.

Although originally a defensive lineman, after transferring to South Carolina, Dixon transitioned to the linebacker position. In his two-year career with the Gamecocks, he made 70 tackles in each season. Additionally, he was named the team’s defensive player of the year in 1990, after finishing the season with three sacks and four tackles for loss.

Professional career
Dixon played for the Cleveland Browns, the Cincinnati Bengals, the San Diego Chargers, and the Oakland Raiders. Dixon was drafted by the Browns in the 1992 NFL Draft. In 1999, Gerald's father and brother were both killed in the same week. Gerald retired in 2001, to return home and help raise his nephews. He is currently a Physical Education teacher and Little League Coach at Sylvia Circle Elementary School, and he also is the linebackers coach at his old high school Rock Hill High School in Rock Hill, SC.

References

1969 births
Living people
People from Rock Hill, South Carolina
American football linebackers
South Carolina Gamecocks football players
Cleveland Browns players
Cincinnati Bengals players
San Diego Chargers players
Players of American football from Charlotte, North Carolina
Players of American football from South Carolina
Rock Hill High School (South Carolina) alumni